Karen Quinlan may refer to:

 Karen Ann Quinlan (1954 – 1985), an American woman at the centre of a right-to-die controversy
 Karen Louise Quinlan Australian art gallery director